Juan-Philip Smith (born 30 March 1994) is a South African professional rugby union player who plays for the Seattle Seawolves in Major League Rugby (MLR) in the United States. His regular position is scrum-half, but he has played as a fly-half on occasion.

Career

Border (2010–11)

At high school level, Smith earned provincial selection to represent Border. He played for them at the 2010 Under-16 Grant Khomo Week in Upington and the 2011 Under-18 Craven Week – South Africa's premier high school competition – in Kimberley. He was also eligible to play at the 2012 Craven Week, but was not picked as he had agreed to join the Pretoria-based  and fell foul of a newly adopted Border Rugby Football Union policy of not picking players for their Craven Week squad that already signed contracts with other unions.

Blue Bulls and South Africa Under-20 (2013–15)

He started in twelve matches for the  side in the 2013 Under-19 Provincial Championship, including three matches as a fly-half. He scored a total of 31 points during the season, including 14 points in their match against , which also saw Smith score his only try of the competition. The Blue Bulls won all twelve of their matches during the regular season to finish top of the log and to quality for the title play-offs. Smith started in their 37–21 victory over the s in the semi-final and in the final, where he helped his side become champions by beating Gauteng rivals  35–23.

In 2014, he was included in the ' squad for the 2014 Vodacom Cup competition. However, he failed to appear in this competition as he was included in the South Africa Under-20 squad that participated at the IRB Junior World Championship held in New Zealand. He played off the bench in their first match as South Africa beat Scotland 61–5, and started their other two matches in the pool stage, a 33–24 win over hosts New Zealand and a 21–8 win over Samoa to finish top of their pool. He started their semi-final match as they again met New Zealand in the semi-finals and beat them, this time by a 32–25 scoreline, to qualify to their second final. He remained the starting scrum-half for the final, but was on the losing side as England won the match 21–20 to consign South Africa to the runner-up spot.

Smith returned to domestic action with the s in the 2014 Under-21 Provincial Championship. He started six of their matches in the competition and appeared as a replacement in four more. He started their 23–19 victory over the s in the semi-final, but did not feature in the final, where the Blue Bulls beat  20–10 to be crowned champions.

He was again named in the ' squad for the 2015 Vodacom Cup. He also started in their semi-final match against , but ended on the losing side as the team from Cape Town ran out 10–6 winners.

He featured in nine of the s' matches in the 2015 Under-21 Provincial Championship.

Cheetahs (2016–)

References

1994 births
Living people
Blue Bulls players
Free State Cheetahs players
Expatriate rugby union players in the United States
People from Bloemhof
Rugby union scrum-halves
Seattle Seawolves players
South Africa Under-20 international rugby union players
South African expatriate rugby union players
South African expatriate sportspeople in the United States
Southern Kings players
Eastern Province Elephants players
South African rugby union players
Rugby union players from North West (South African province)